Piloblephis is a monotypic genus of flowering plant in the family Lamiaceae, first described in 1838. It contains only one known species, Piloblephis rigida, the wild pennyroyal, or pennyroyal native to Florida, southern Georgia, and the Bahamas.

References

Lamiaceae
Flora of the Bahamas
Flora of the Southeastern United States
Monotypic Lamiaceae genera
Taxa named by Constantine Samuel Rafinesque